Vazh-Palnik is a rural locality (a village) in Oshibskoye Rural Settlement, Kudymkarsky District, Perm Krai, Russia. The population was 8 as of 2010.

Geography 
Vazh-Palnik is located 33 km northeast of Kudymkar (the district's administrative centre) by road. Rocheva is the nearest rural locality.

References 

Rural localities in Kudymkarsky District